Idiophantis is a genus of moths in the family Gelechiidae.

Species
The species of this genus are:
Idiophantis acanthopa Meyrick, 1931 (from India)
Idiophantis anisosticta Meyrick, 1916 (from Sri Lanka)
Idiophantis callicarpa Meyrick, 1927 (from Samoa)
Idiophantis carpotoma Meyrick, 1916 (from India)
Idiophantis chalcura Meyrick, 1907 (from India)
Idiophantis chiridota Meyrick, 1914 (India, Sri Lanka, Indonesia)
Idiophantis croconota Meyrick, 1918 (from Madagascar)
Idiophantis discura Meyrick, 1907 (from Sri Lanka)
Idiophantis disparata Meyrick, 1923 (from Fiji)
Idiophantis eugeniae Bradley, 1969 (Papua New Guinea)
Idiophantis habrias Meyrick, 1904 (from Australia)
Idiophantis hemiphaea Meyrick, 1907 (from India)
Idiophantis insomnis (Meyrick, 1904) (from Australia)
Idiophantis lomatographa Bradley, 1962 (from New Hebrides)
Idiophantis maelamunensis Moriuti, 1993 (from Thailand)
Idiophantis melanosacta Meyrick, 1907 (from India and Thailand)
Idiophantis pandata Bradley, 1961 (from Guadalcanal)
Idiophantis paraptila Meyrick, 1916 (from Sri Lanka)
Idiophantis soreuta Meyrick, 1906  (from Thailand and Sri Lanka)
Idiophantis spectrata Meyrick, 1911 (from Seychelles)
Idiophantis stoica Meyrick, 1911 (from India)
Idiophantis thiopeda Meyrick, 1931 (Papua New Guinea)
Idiophantis valerieae Guillermet, 2010 (La Réunion)

References

 
Anacampsini
Taxa named by Edward Meyrick
Moth genera